Welcome to Holyrood Academy Wiki page.
Holyrood Academy, previously known as Holyrood Community School before September 2010, is a secondary school with academy status in Chard, Somerset, England. From April 2017 to August 2019 it was part of the Vector Learning Trust, a Multi Academy Trust which also included the nearby Axe Valley Academy in Axminster.

In September 2019, both Holyrood and Axe Valley joined the Uffculme Academy Trust.

The school has existed from somewhere around 1910, previously being referred to as "Holyrood Secondary Modern School", "Holyrood Secondary School", "Holyrood Comprehensive School" and "Holyrood Community School".

As of 2019, Holyrood Academy has 1,276 pupils between the ages of 11 and 18, 100 teachers, 23 teaching assistants and 37 support staff.

Students are taught for 25 lessons a week, each is 60 minutes long. In addition, students have a daily tutorial period (20 minutes).

Holyrood Academy also has a sixth form on campus offering BTEC and A level courses to 16-18 year olds.

Notable students 
Ben Hamer, English footballer

Matthew Clay - 2006 Commonwealth Games Gold Medallist in Swimming

References

External links 
 

Academies in Somerset
Chard, Somerset
Secondary schools in Somerset